The Great Bush Railway is a private,  narrow gauge running round the edge of Tinkers Park, Hadlow Down, Sussex. The railway is operated by the Claude Jessett Trust Company.
The line is 500 meters long and has three stations, Hadlow Down, Bracherlands Junction and Tinkers Lane.

The railway only runs on Tinkers Park events.

History 

The line was laid down by Claude Jessett as an attraction to accompany the yearly steam rallies and as a replacement for an earlier miniature railway that existed around his garden. A heavily converted Motor Rail (later named Aminal [sic.]) was acquired from a nearby brickworks. This, alongside coaches built from brick trolleys, ran for a couple of years.

A volunteer group (named FIDO, not an acronym, but named due to the age of the volunteers) established themselves on the site and ran the line. More locomotives were acquired, putting the very worn Aminal out of use. Later the coaches were retired and a bogie coach built to take their place. Over time the FIDO group left for pastures new and the line has since been run by the Claude Jessett Trust as part of the Tinkers Park site.

The line was extended gradually, with a cutting dug by hand, to allow the line to run along the edge of an adjoining field.

The line today 
The line runs in a U shape around the edge of a field. From Hadlow Down station, there is a straight run alongside the "Great Bush" which gives the railway its name, before reaching the locomotive shed, workshop and various sidings. After passing alongside, the line then reaches Bracherlands junction passing loop. The line then drops into a 1in25 curve situated in a cutting. The cutting being the largest feature on the line, having been dug gradually while the old organ museum halt being the end of the line (removed and replaced by the latter Bracherlands Junction platform.)
After the cutting the line has taken a 180 degree turn running alongside another hedge before crossing over an access road between event fields and ending at Tinkers Lane station.

Current Locomotives

Former Locomotives

Current Rolling Stock

Former Rolling Stock

References

See also

 British narrow gauge railways
 Tinkers Park - Home of The Claude Jessett Collection

2 ft gauge railways in England
Railway lines opened in 1971